{{Speciesbox
|name = Coolibah
|image = Eucalyptus coolabah and creek.jpg
|genus = Eucalyptus
|species = coolabah
| status = NT
| status_system = IUCN3.1
| status_ref = 
|authority = Blakely & Jacobs
|synonyms_ref =
|synonyms = 
 Eucalyptus coolabah subsp. arida (Blakely) L.A.S.Johnson & K.D.Hill 
 Eucalyptus coolabah Blakely & Jacobs subsp. coolabah 
 Eucalyptus coolabah subsp. excerata L.A.S.Johnson & K.D.Hill 
 Eucalyptus coolabah var. arida Blakely 
 Eucalyptus coolabah Blakely & Jacobs var. coolabah Eucalyptus gymnoteles L.A.S.Johnson & K.D.Hill 
 Eucalyptus raveretiana var. jerichoensis Domin 
 Eucalyptus microtheca auct. non F.Muell.: Jessop
}}Eucalyptus coolabah, commonly known as coolibah or coolabah, is a species of tree found in eastern inland Australia. It has rough bark on part or all of the trunk, smooth powdery cream to pink bark above, lance-shaped to curved adult leaves, flower buds in groups of seven and hemispherical or conical fruit.

The upper bark is smooth and powdery, white to cream-coloured, pale grey or pink and is shed in short ribbons.

The flower buds are arranged on a branching inflorescence in leaf axils with groups of seven buds on each branch. Flowering has been recorded in most months and the flowers are white.

Taxonomy and namingEucalyptus coolabah was first formally described in 1934 by William Blakely and Maxwell Jacobs and the description was published in Blakely's book, A Key to the Eucalypts. The specific epithet (coolabah) and the common name is a loanword from the Indigenous Australian Yuwaaliyaay word, gulabaa.

Distribution and habitat
Coolibah is found in western New South Wales, central South Australia, the Kimberley region of Western Australia, western Queensland and southern to central parts of the Northern Territory.

The tree occurs on occasionally flooded heavy-soiled plains and banks of intermittent streams and creeks that will usually not flow often enough to support the river red gum, E. camaldulensis.

Uses
The heartwood is a reddish brown colour and much darker than the sapwood. Indigenous Australians used the wood to make spears, fire-making apparatus, message sticks, coolamons (wooden dishes) and throwing sticks. They would also obtain water from the rootwood. 
  
See also
 List of Eucalyptus species "Waltzing Matilda"—the coolibah tree is mentioned in this famous folk song
 The Dig Tree—the coolabah tree is a  landmark which marks the place where Camp LXV was set up by Burke and Wills’ party attracting over 35,000 tourists each year.

References

 Holliday, I. A field guide to Australian trees (3rd edition), Reed New Holland, 2002
 Cronin, L. Key Guide to Australian Trees'', Envirobook, 2000

External links

coolabah
Myrtales of Australia
Flora of Queensland
Eucalypts of Western Australia
Flora of South Australia
Flora of New South Wales
Flora of the Northern Territory
Trees of Australia
Drought-tolerant trees
Plants described in 1934
Taxa named by William Blakely